is the second studio album by Japanese singer Shizuka Kudo. It was released on July 21, 1988, through Pony Canyon. The eponymous record is often cited as an EP, despite being officially regarded as her second album. Shizuka is entirely written and composed by Miyuki Nakajima and Tsugutoshi Gotō, respectively. Nakajima recorded a cover of the fifth track, "Hadashi no Lion", for her album Otogibanashi: Fairy Ring (2002). Shizuka was re-issued in gold CD on March 21, 1989, and later in APO-CD format on December 1, 1993.

Commercial performance
Shizuka debuted at number one on the Oricon Albums Chart, with 69,000 units sold in its first week, making it Kudo's first album to reach the top of the chart. It spent six non-consecutive weeks in the top ten. The album charted in the top 100 for twenty weeks, selling a reported total of 265,000 copies during its run. Shizuka was ranked number 35 on the year-end Oricon Albums Chart.

Track listing
All lyrics written by Miyuki Nakajima; all tracks composed and arranged by Tsugutoshi Gotō.

Charts

Release history

See also
 List of Oricon number-one albums

References

1988 albums
Shizuka Kudo albums
Pony Canyon albums